Juan Ignacio Álvarez Morinigo (born 27 October 1997) is an Argentine professional footballer who plays as a midfielder for Chacarita Juniors.

Club career
Álvarez's senior career started with Chacarita Juniors, then of Primera B Nacional. He played twenty-seven times in 2016–17, including his debut on 27 August 2016 in a 1–1 draw versus Instituto. 2016–17 ended with promotion to the Argentine Primera División. He signed a new contract with Chacarita in September 2017. Álvarez's top-flight debut came against Independiente on 15 October, while two weeks later he scored his first professional goal in a 2–1 defeat to Newell's Old Boys.

Career statistics
.

References

External links

1997 births
Living people
Sportspeople from Buenos Aires Province
Argentine footballers
Argentine expatriate footballers
Association football midfielders
Primera Nacional players
Argentine Primera División players
Super League Greece players
Chacarita Juniors footballers
Panetolikos F.C. players
Flandria footballers
Argentine expatriate sportspeople in Greece
Expatriate footballers in Greece